The Los Angeles Art Association (LAAA) is a membership-based, 501(c)(3) non-profit organization that supports Southern California artists. LAAA's mission is to provide opportunities, resources, services and exhibition venues for artists living in Southern California, with an emphasis on emerging talent. Founded in 1925, LAAA has launched the art careers of many celebrated artists and has played a central role in the formation of Los Angeles' arts community.

Gallery 825
Gallery 825 on La Cienega Boulevard, which was purchased in 1958, is LAAA's exhibition arm for contemporary art. There are four individual gallery spaces within the main building, which allows the gallery to host four individual programs simultaneously. The largest gallery, the North Gallery, hosts juried group shows, while the smaller galleries (South, Center and Wurdemann) feature solo artist exhibitions. Gallery 825 also extends its venue to local non-profit groups.

LAAA hosts a wide variety of group shows, solo shows, lectures, workshops and artist talks. All LAAA exhibition opportunities are juried by regional and national art professionals.

Events and Exhibitions in Los Angeles

Solo and Group Shows 
Each year, LAAA holds eight shows at Gallery 825 for their artist members. Themes for previous shows involved topics such as the intersection between art and technology; superficial likeness or image in contemporary culture; and multiples, patterns, and repetition in contemporary art practice. Shows include:
juried group member shows
open juried shows for both members and non-members
solo and group shows
invitationals
proposals

Although most exhibitions only feature members, LAAA has two annual shows available to all Southern Californian artists: the Open Show and Out There, occurring every December. Out There is an exhibition that celebrates the LGBT experience during West Hollywood's Pride Month festivities.

Annual Benefit Auction

Art Fairs 
 LA Art Show
 Photo LA
 Art Platform
 Beverly Hills Art Show
 Palm Springs Fine Art Fair

National and International Presence

United States 
Harvard
Art Basel Miami

International

Switzerland 
Art Basel

Programs 
Other LAAA programs include:
 Mentoring opportunities for young artists with established artists
 Workshops for career preparedness and workplace readiness
 Panel discussions with artists and art historians
 Film & Video 825 - screenings of local and nationally recognized video artists’ work
 Artist sponsorships
 Peer critique groups
 Public art classes
 International cultural exchange opportunities

Exclusive Events for Art Supporters

Emerging Arts Leader Awards

LAAAb 
Shepard Fairey dinner

Admissions
There are two opportunities for non-member artists to apply for membership. Screenings are held at the beginning and middle of each calendar year. A seven-member panel composed of art collectors, artist members, LAAA board members and prominent figures from other local art institutions select artists for admission based on the strength of their work and their potential to succeed. There is no defined criteria for acceptance; typically, accepted artists are at the stage of development where they are ready to engage in dialogue with the contemporary art world on a domestic and international level.

Guest jurors differ for each screening, thereby allowing for a more objective screening process. Previously rejected applicants, who apply again, will always have their work reviewed by a new exhibition committee. Although LAAA has no restriction for the number of admitted artists, the application process has proven to be highly selective. On average, LAAA receives 150 submissions per screening and accepts only about 20% of them.

Notable LAAA Artists
LAAA has approximately 300 artist members. Through LAAA's exposure to notable curators, gallery directors and collectors, artists have exhibited in prestigious museums, international art fairs and commercial galleries. 
 Mei Xian Qiu has had two solo museum exhibitions in New York City and in Los Angeles. Her work has been shown in Photo LA, Art Platform and at the Ping Pong exhibition during Art Basel  and Art Basel Miami. Qiu has been featured in ZOOM Photographic Art Magazine, Fabrik Magazine and Artweek.LA.
 Meeson Pae Yang's solo exhibitions and projects have been shown internationally and nationally at Galerie Kashya Hildebrand (Zurich, Switzerland), FuXin Gallery (Shanghai, China), ArtHK (Hong Kong, China), ARCO (Madrid, Spain), Contemporary Istanbul (Istanbul, Turkey), and LAUNCHLA (Los Angeles, California). Yang is a recipient of the James Irvine Foundation's California New Visions Award, the Durfee Foundation's ARC award, the Burkhardt Foundation Award, and the Alpay Award. Yang has been featured in Sculpture Magazine, Art Ltd Magazine, Theme Magazine, the Korea Times, and the Los Angeles Times.
 J.T. Burke worked for 20 years as a nationally recognized advertising photographer and commercial director. In 2010, he mounted his first public exhibition of personal work that was shown in Barcelona, Spain; Bristol, UK; and Santa Barbara, California. His unique photo digital collage works have been exhibited in galleries and art fairs in New York City and throughout California.
 Born to Azerbaijani parents in Tehran, Iran in 1984, Marjan Vayghan immigrated to the United States in the spring of 1995, settling with her family in Los Angeles, California. Marjan continues to live alternately between Tehran and Los Angeles. Her practice is informed by this context of movement and flexible citizenship across both geographical and cultural spaces, and the multiple realities these spaces engender. Vayghan’s solo exhibition at Gallery 825 received wide press and publication, including an interview with the Huffington Post.
 YaYa Chou has had solo exhibitions at Den Contemporary Art in West Hollywood, Fort Wayne Museum of Art in Indiana, and Gallery 825. Her work was included in group exhibitions at Museum of Modern Art, New York, Virginia Museum of Contemporary Art, Virginia, and several Southern California galleries. She is the recipient of the 2011 Fellowship at the Lucas Artists Residency, Montalvo Arts Center, California, and twice she was awarded the Durfee Foundation Grant (2010 and 2007). Chou has received several honors and awards for her animated films.

 The abstract impressionist artist Tommy Hollenstein has exhibited his paintings throughout Southern California and has been featured in LA Weekly, Angeleno and The Scottsdale Tribune. Tommy’s work resides in the personal collections of numerous well known celebrities and art collectors.

References

External links
Official website

Non-profit organizations based in Los Angeles
Culture of Los Angeles
Art in Greater Los Angeles